The Restless Kind is American country music artist Travis Tritt's fifth studio album, released on Warner Bros. Records in 1996. The tracks "More Than You'll Ever Know", "Helping Me Get over You" (a duet with Lari White), "She's Going Home with Me", and "Where Corn Don't Grow" were released as singles, all peaking in the Top 40 on the country charts. "Where Corn Don't Grow" was previously recorded by Waylon Jennings on his 1990 album The Eagle, and was a #67-peaking single for him that year. "Double Trouble" was a duet with Tritt's long-time friend and recording partner Marty Stuart.

Track listing

Personnel
Kenny Aronoff - drums, percussion
Sam Bacco - percussion, timpani
Mike Brignardello - bass guitar
Larry Byrom - acoustic guitar
David Campbell - string arrangements
Wendell Cox - electric guitar
Joel Derouin - violin
Mark Goldenberg - acoustic guitar
Portia Griffin - background vocals
Mike Henderson - electric guitar
Roy Huskey, Jr. - upright bass
Suzie Katayama - cello
Peter Kent - violin
Mark O'Connor - fiddle, mandolin
Herb Pedersen - background vocals
Jimmy Joe Ruggiere - harmonica
Myrna Smith - background vocals
Marty Stuart - acoustic guitar, electric guitar, mandolin, sitar, duet vocals on "Double Trouble"
Benmont Tench - organ, piano
Lee Thornberg - trumpet
Travis Tritt - acoustic guitar, electric guitar, lead vocals, background vocals
Robby Turner - dobro, lap steel guitar, pedal steel guitar
Lari White - duet vocals on "Helping Me Get Over You"
Reggie Young - electric guitar

Charts

Weekly charts

Year-end charts

References

1996 albums
Travis Tritt albums
Warner Records albums
Albums produced by Don Was